William Rosenberg (12 February 1920 – 6 November 2014) was a Danish actor. He appeared in more than 35 films and television shows between 1948 and 2008.

Selected filmography
 Mosekongen (1950)
 Fodboldpræsten (1951)
 Det store løb (1952)
 Arvingen (1954)
 Der brænder en ild (1962)
 Dronningens vagtmester (1963)
 South of Tana River (1963)
 Magic in Town (1968)
 Kid Gang on the Go (1971)

References

External links

1920 births
2014 deaths
20th-century Danish male actors
21st-century Danish male actors
Danish male film actors
Danish male television actors
Male actors from Copenhagen